The People's Socialist Front or Popular Socialist Front (FSP) was a socialist political party in Portugal, founded in 1974. It was a breakaway group from the Socialist Party.

History
The group was founded in December 1974 by Manuel Serra, a Marxist who had previously attempted to become leader of the Socialist Party. He had been imprisoned for several years during the authoritarian Estado Novo regime. Under his leadership, the FSP took place in violent demonstrations, including riots in Setúbal.

In the 1975 Constituent Assembly election, the FSP received less than 5% of the vote and won zero seats.

The FSP ran candidates in the 1976 legislative election, and participated in the 1976 local election in coalition with the Portuguese Communist Party and the Portuguese Democratic Movement inside the Electoral Front United People.

On 7 July 2004, after several years of inactivity, the party was declared extinct by the Portuguese Constitutional Court.

References

Defunct socialist parties in Portugal
1974 establishments in Portugal
Political parties established in 1974
Political parties disestablished in the 2000s
2000s disestablishments in Portugal